Christopher M. Markey is the current member of the Massachusetts House of Representatives for the 9th Bristol district.

See also
 2019–2020 Massachusetts legislature
 2021–2022 Massachusetts legislature

References

Democratic Party members of the Massachusetts House of Representatives
People from Dartmouth, Massachusetts
Stonehill College alumni
Living people
21st-century American politicians
Year of birth missing (living people)